Eupatorium serotinum, also known as late boneset or late thoroughwort, is a fall-blooming herbaceous plant native to North America.

Eupatorium serotinum ranges throughout most of the eastern United States, found in every coastal state from Massachusetts to Texas and inland as far as Minnesota and Nebraska. There are reports of one small population in the Canadian Province of Ontario, and other reports of the species on the south side of the Río Grande in northern Mexico.

Like other members of the genus Eupatorium, Eupatorium serotinum is about one to two meters (40–80 inches) tall and has inflorescences containing a large number of tiny white flower heads with 9–15 disc florets but no ray florets.

Eupatorium serotinum grows in open sites (either dry or moist), and can hybridize with Eupatorium perfoliatum and other members of the genus Eupatorium.  Unlike wind-pollinated plants in this genus, E. serotinum is pollinated by insects.

References

Further reading 
 
 Yatskievych, George Alfred. "Steyermark's Flora of Missouri. Volume 2. Rev. ed." St. Louis: Missouri Dept. of Conservation in assoc. with Missouri Botanical Garden xii, 991p-illus..  En Icones, Maps, Anatomy and morphology, Keys. Geog 3 (1999).

External links 
 Photo from the Ozarks Regional Herbarium of Missouri State University
 Photo of herbarium specimen at Missouri Botanical Garden, collected in Missouri in 1993
 From the blog "Nadia's Backyard, a native plant blog in central Missouri.

serotinum
Flora of North America
Plants described in 1803